Alindile Mhletywa is a South African cricketer. He made his List A debut on 20 October 2019, for Border in the 2019–20 CSA Provincial One-Day Challenge. He made his first-class debut on 24 October 2019, for Border in the 2019–20 CSA 3-Day Provincial Cup. He made his Twenty20 debut on 12 February 2022, for Warriors in the 2021–22 CSA T20 Challenge.

References

External links
 

Year of birth missing (living people)
Living people
South African cricketers
Border cricketers
Warriors cricketers
Place of birth missing (living people)